Sibiu International Airport or Aeroportul Internațional Sibiu  serves the city of Sibiu.

History
In 1943, the flying activities have been developed on a field (with grass) of 174 ha surface. The Lockheed operating planes belonged to the first Romanian operating airline - LARES. The first routes were Bucharest – Sibiu – Arad and Bucharest – Sibiu – Oradea. In 1944, Sibiu was connected by air with some other cities like Bucharest, Brasov, Deva, Oradea and Targu-Mures. In 1959, it was inaugurated the airport building with two floors, a control tower, a waiting room for 50 passengers on each way (embarking and debarking) and a store-room.

In 1970, the airport was capable to operate during the night, due to the approach and runway guiding lights that have been installed. The concrete runway was 2000m long and 30m wide. In 1975, radar facilities became operational and later in 1992, the airport was opened for international traffic, with flights to Stuttgart and Munich. 

In 2006 - 2008, the airport passed through the most important rehabilitation program in its history, a €77 million investment in a new terminal building and in runway upgrade.

Recent developments
In 2013, Sibiu International Airport handled 189,300 passengers, which represents an increase over the previous year, while in 2014 the number of passengers increased to almost 216,000 and two new destinations to London and Dortmund have been introduced. In 2015, the total traffic grew up to 276,533 embarked-disembarked passengers, while the number of aircraft movements increased to 5,468.

In December 2016, Lufthansa announced its plans to increase operations on Munich – Sibiu route, as the airline scheduled up to 19 weekly flights from 26 March 2017. The airline operates this route with CityLine CRJ900 aircraft.

In November 2017, Wizz Air, announced that it will further expand its Sibiu operations, adding a second Airbus A320 aircraft to its local fleet in June 2018. At the same time, WIZZ will launch five long-awaited routes from Sibiu and increase frequencies on four popular services adding a total of 21 incremental flights to its schedule. Together with the new connections to Copenhagen, Charleroi, Paris Beauvais, Basel and Frankfurt Hahn, starting in June 2018, Sibiu's low fare network will be expanded to a total of 11 routes to 8 countries. The additional aircraft will also allow WIZZ to increase the frequency of flights on four services from summer 2018: London-Luton route will become daily; Memmingen Munich and Dortmund flights will increase to five, while the connection to Nuremberg will be operated four times per week.

Airlines and destinations
The following airlines operate regular scheduled and charter flights at Sibiu Airport:

Statistics

Traffic figures

Busiest routes

See also
Aviation in Romania
Transport in Romania

References

External links

 Official website
 Google Maps - Aerial View
 

Airports in Romania
Airport, Sibiu International
Buildings and structures in Sibiu County
Airports established in 1943
1943 establishments in Romania